Cheremshan (Çirmeşän) is a rural locality (a selo) and the administrative center of Cheremshansky District in the Republic of Tatarstan, Russia, located on the Bolshoy Cheremshan River. Population:

References

Rural localities in Tatarstan
Bugulminsky Uyezd